The 2021 Puebla ePrix (formally the 2021 CBMM Niobium Puebla E-Prix) was a pair of Formula E electric car races held at the Autódromo Miguel E. Abed in the town of Amozoc near Puebla, Mexico on 19 and 20 June 2021. With usual Mexico City ePrix venue Autódromo Hermanos Rodríguez being used as a temporary hospital for COVID-19 patients, a replacement had to be found, making this the inaugural running of a competitive Formula E event at the track, and the sixth in the country. It marked the eighth and ninth rounds of the 2020–21 Formula E season.

The first race was won by Lucas di Grassi ahead of his teammate René Rast and Edoardo Mortara, after pole-sitter and original race winner Pascal Wehrlein was disqualified due to a technical infraction. Edoardo Mortara won the second race to claim the championship lead, with Nick Cassidy and Oliver Rowland rounding out the podium.

Classification

Race one

Qualifying

Notes:
  – Joel Eriksson and Sérgio Sette Câmara received a 20-place grid penalty each for changing the inverters in their Dragon / Penske Autosport cars. As they didn't qualify high enough to drop all 20 positions, they had to serve a drive-through penalty at the start of the race.

Race

Notes:
  – Fastest lap.
  – Pole position; fastest in group stage.
  – Both Porsche and both Nissan e.dams cars were disqualified due to a technical infraction. Wehrlein, Lotterer and Buemi originally finished 1st, 16th and 18th, while Rowland had retired in the pits.

Standings after the race

Drivers' Championship standings

Teams' Championship standings

 Notes: Only the top five positions are included for both sets of standings.

Race two

Qualifying

Race

Notes:
  – Pole position.
  – Fastest in group stage.
  – Fastest lap.
  – Pascal Wehrlein received a post-race 5-second time penalty for an improper use of the Fanboost.
  – Sérgio Sette Câmara received a 5-second time penalty for causing a collision.

Standings after the race

Drivers' Championship standings

Teams' Championship standings

 Notes: Only the top five positions are included for both sets of standings.

Notes

References

|- style="text-align:center"
|width="35%"|Previous race:2021 Monaco ePrix
|width="30%"|FIA Formula E World Championship2020–21 season
|width="35%"|Next race:2021 New York City ePrix
|- style="text-align:center"
|width="35%"|Previous race:N/A
|width="30%"|Puebla ePrix
|width="35%"|Next race:N/A
|- style="text-align:center"

2021
2020–21 Formula E season
2021 in Mexican motorsport
June 2021 sports events in Mexico